Ratish Lal (born 1962) is a Fijian international lawn bowler.

Bows career
Lal has won five medals at the Asia Pacific Bowls Championships.

He was selected to represent Fiji at three Commonwealth Games; the fours at the 2002 Commonwealth Games, the triples at the 2006 Commonwealth Games, and the triples and fours at the 2014 Commonwealth Games.

He became the team manager for Fiji.

References

1962 births
Fijian male bowls players
Living people
Bowls players at the 2002 Commonwealth Games
Bowls players at the 2006 Commonwealth Games
Bowls players at the 2014 Commonwealth Games
Commonwealth Games competitors for Fiji